Friday Harbor High School  is a four-year public high school located in Friday Harbor, Washington, USA.  It is the only public high school on San Juan Island.

Staff, students and culture
Martin Yablonovsky has been the school's principal since 2020. The previous principals have included Fred Woods, Patricia Scott, Marilyn Luckman and Ralph Hahn.  
The school enrolls approximately 300 students annually.  Their school mascot is the wolverine, and their colors are purple and gold.

Funding
FHHS is a Gates High Tech High School since it received a grant from the Bill and Melinda Gates Foundation through the Connecting Schools and Communities (CSAC) project in Washington State. The grant is to ensure that more students leave high school ready for college, work, and civic contribution.

Achievement
The school's team for the National Ocean Sciences Bowl has had success winning the Washington regional title known as the Orca Bowl in 2004, 2005, 2010, 2011 and 2012..  In 2004 they were second overall  in the national competition losing to Mission San Jose High School from Fremont, California. Their WASL (Washington Assessment of Student Learning) testing scores are consistently above the state's average. Students are now required to pass the WASL to graduate. Most students take the WASL in tenth grade, but it is an option to take it as a freshman.

References

External links
 Friday Harbor High School official webpage
 School District webpage
 OSPI school report card 2012-13

High schools in San Juan County, Washington
Public high schools in Washington (state)